Gröschel is a German family name. Notable people with the name include:

 Benedict Groeschel (1933–2014), American Catholic priest
 Bernhard Gröschel (1939–2009), German linguist and slavist
 Cornelia Gröschel (born 1987), German actress
 Craig Groeschel (born 1967), American Methodist pastor
 Ernst Gröschel (1918–2000), German pianist

German-language surnames